Joseph or Joe Lee may refer to:

People
 Joe Lee (actor) (1956–2003), Hong Kong actor
 John Joseph Lee (Joe Lee or J.J. Lee, born 1942), Irish historian and Senator
 Joseph Lee (poet) (1876–1949), Scottish poet, artist and journalist
 Joseph Lee (recreation advocate) (1862–1937), father of the playground movement
 Joseph Lee (Hong Kong politician) (Joseph Lee Kok-long, born 1959), nurse, and professor
 J. Bracken Lee (1899–1996), Governor of Utah
 Joe Lee (squash player) (born 1989), English squash player
 Joseph Lee (American politician) (1901–1991), politician in Boston, Massachusetts
 Joseph E. Lee, lawyer, judge and politician in Florida
 Joseph Lee (inventor), American baker and inventor

Places
 Joseph Lee, Baltimore, a neighborhood in Baltimore

See also

Joseph Lees (disambiguation)

Lee, Joseph